Too Old to Die Young is an American crime drama streaming miniseries directed by Nicolas Winding Refn, written by Refn, Ed Brubaker and Halley Gross, and starring Miles Teller and Augusto Aguilera. It premiered on Amazon on June 14, 2019.

The series received praise directed at Refn's signature style and Teller's performance but criticisms were raised regarding the depiction of sexual violence and the treatment of female characters. Amazon said in 2019 that they did not intend to produce a second season.

Premise
Too Old to Die Young follows "a grieving police officer who, along with the man who shot his partner, finds himself in an underworld filled with working-class hit men, Yakuza soldiers, cartel assassins sent from Mexico, Russian mafia captains and gangs of teenage killers."

Cast and characters

Main
 Miles Teller as Martin Jones
 Augusto Aguilera as Jesus Rojas
 Cristina Rodlo as Yaritza
 Nell Tiger Free as Janey Carter
 John Hawkes as Viggo Larsen
 Jena Malone as Diana DeYoung

Recurring

Episodes

Production

Development

On February 8, 2017, it was announced that Amazon had given the production a series order for a first season consisting of ten episodes. The series was slated to be written by Nicolas Winding Refn and Ed Brubaker both of whom were also set to executive produce alongside Jeffrey Stott. Additionally, Refn was expected to direct every episode of the series and Rachel Dik and Alexander H. Gayner were set to serve as producers.

Casting
On March 27, 2017, it was announced that Miles Teller had been cast in the series lead role of Martin, a character described as "a police officer entangled in the world of assassins." On November 21, 2017, the rest of the main cast was announced and included Billy Baldwin, Jena Malone, John Hawkes, Cristina Rodlo, Augusto Aguilera, Nell Tiger Free, Babs Olusanmokun, and Callie Hernandez. On February 7, 2018, it was reported that Hart Bochner had joined the series in a recurring capacity. On August 29, 2018, Refn announced through his official Twitter account that George Payne had been cast in the series.

Filming
On November 27, 2017, principal photography for the series began in Los Angeles, California. Filming for the first episode ended on January 17, 2018. On March 6, 2018, filming for an episode began in Albuquerque, New Mexico, and was expected to continue there through March before returning to Los Angeles. On August 11, 2018, principal photography for the series ended.

Soundtrack

Cliff Martinez composed the score for the series, his fourth collaboration with Nicolas Winding Refn. Like previous works of Winding Refn, the series also features a variety of electronic music and punk rock by bands like Goldfrapp, The Leather Nun, Frankie Miller and Jimmie Angel. A soundtrack album featuring Martinez's score as well as pre-existing pop music featured in the show was released on June 14, 2019.

Release
Episodes four and five of the series premiered out of competition at the 2019 Cannes Film Festival on May 18. The full series premiered on Amazon Prime Video on June 14 of the same year.

Marketing
On February 28, 2018, a series of first look images from the series were released. On May 21, 2018, Refn released the first teaser trailer through his personal Twitter account.

Reception
On Rotten Tomatoes, the series has an approval rating of 70% with an average score of 6.6 out of 10 based on 37 reviews. The site's critical consensus is, "Grim and graphic, Too Old to Die Young is stylish, but its languid story does little to justify its violent tendencies – though fans of Refn's may find enjoyment in its neon laden misery." Conversely, Eric Kohn of IndieWire offered praise of the series, writing: "there’s certainly some potential in Too Old to Die Young, at least for audiences who can appreciate aspects of Refn’s dark style and punkish sensibility." Peter Bradshaw of The Guardian gave the episodes 4 out of a possible 5 stars, stating: "Too Old To Die Young is macabre, and nauseating in many ways, but very well made and very watchable."

References

External links
 

2010s American drama television series
2010s American television series
2019 American television series debuts
2019 American television series endings
English-language television shows
Amazon Prime Video original programming
Television series by Amazon Studios
Works about Mexican drug cartels
Works about the Yakuza
Works by Ed Brubaker
Neo-Western television series